Karoline dos Santos Oliveira (born January 1, 1986), known professionally as Karol Conká, is a Brazilian singer-songwriter. Her music is a blend of modern hip-hop and rap with sounds from Brazilian pop and traditional music. In 2013, she won Multishow's Best New Artist award and released her debut album, Batuk Freak. Her song, "Boa Noite", is featured in the EA Sports video game, FIFA 14. Her album Ambulante was ranked as the 34th best Brazilian album of 2018 by the Brazilian edition of Rolling Stone magazine and among the 25 best Brazilian albums of the second half of 2018 by the São Paulo Association of Art Critics.

Karol Conká publicly came out as bisexual and sapiosexual. She is an advocate of feminism.

In January 2021, she was announced as a contestant of the reality show Big Brother Brasil 21. Her sarcastic and non-empathic behavior towards her housemates has garnered a very negative reception from the participants and viewers alike. On February 23, she was evicted from the reality show with a record-breaking 99.17% of the public vote.

Her life is depicted in the 2021 Globoplay documentary series A Vida Depois do Tombo.

Discography 
Albums
 2001 - Karol Conka

 2013 - Batuk Freak
 2018 - Ambulante
 2022 - Urucum

Singles
 2011 - Boa Noite
 2014 - Tombei
 2015 - É o Poder
2017 - Lalá
2018 - Kaça
2018 - Cabeça de Nego (Prod. Instituto & Boss in Drama)
2019 - Saudade
2019 - Nossa Que Isso (feat. Mc Rebecca & MC Rogê)
2019 - Alavancô (feat. Gloria Groove & Linn Da Quebrada)
2021 - Dilúvio (feat. Leo Justi)
2021 - Mal Nenhum
2021 - Subida
2021 - Louca e Sagaz
2022 - Paredawn

References

External links  
 
 

Brazilian women rappers
1987 births
Living people
Afro-Brazilian feminists
LGBT Afro-Brazilians
Brazilian LGBT singers
Brazilian bisexual people
Bisexual feminists
Bisexual actresses
Bisexual singers
Feminist musicians
Afro-Brazilian women singers
Brazilian women pop singers
Afro-Brazilian female models
Brazilian female models
People from Curitiba
Big Brother (franchise) contestants
Big Brother Brasil
LGBT people in Latin music
Women in Latin music
Sapiosexual people